"Best Years of Our Lives" is a song recorded by English band Modern Romance. It was released in October 1982 as a 7-inch single and 12-inch single by WEA. A Japanese and German edition was also released.

Formats

7-inch single

The 7-inch single was available in two versions:

Best Years of Our Lives
We've Got Them Running (The Counting Song)

A limited edition "Xmas Party Mix" remix of the song became available as a 7-inch single over Christmas 1982, which received substantial radio airplay in place of the original version over Christmas 1982.

12-inch single
Best Years of Our Lives (Parts 1&2) Midnight Mix
Best Years of Our Lives (Parts 1&2) Extended Mix
We've Got Them Running (The Counting Song)

Chart position

History
"Best Years of Our Lives" was the biggest-selling single for Modern Romance. It was the first single to feature Michael J. Mullins as lead vocalist and peaked at number 4 on the UK chart in late 1982. The single can be found on Modern Romance's hit albums Trick of the Light (1983) and Party Tonight (1983). It also made an appearance on their farewell single Best Mix of Our Lives (1985) in a medley with four other singles: High Life, Don't Stop That Crazy Rhythm, Everybody Salsa, and Ay Ay Ay Ay Moosey. It served as a 7-inch single [re-mix] on the B-side of Best Mix of Our Lives and as a 12-inch single [re-mix] on the B-side of the 12-inch version of Best Mix....

The original B-side, We've Got Them Running (The Counting Song), is taken from the Modern Romance debut studio album Adventures in Clubland and features the lead vocals of Geoff Deane. It was written by Modern Romance founder member David Jaymes. The latest appearance of Best Years... is on the compilation CD Modern Romance: The Platinum Collection (2006).

As part of a long string of cover-version songs, Black Lace released their re-creation in 1989.

Personnel
Michael J. Mullins - vocals
David Jaymes - bass guitar
Robbie Jaymes - synthesizer
Paul Gendler - guitar
John Du Prez - trumpet
Andy Kyriacou - drums
Tony Visconti - producer (music)
Geoff Deane - vocals (on We've Got Them Running (The Counting Song))

Baha Men cover

In 2001, the song regained popularity after it was covered by the Bahamian soca/reggae group Baha Men and featured in the hit 2001 computer animated fairy tale comedy Shrek.

It was the Baha Men's sixth single and reached number 49 on the Australian ARIA Charts and number 70 on the Swiss Music Charts. It also appeared on their album Move It Like This.

Critical reception
The Baha Men cover received generally positive reviews. According to the Baltimore Afro-American, the song was "shaping up to be a worthy follow-up to Who Let the Dogs Out?," while Terry vanHorn of MTV.com called it a "playful dance song." Eric Schumacher-Rasmussen, also of MTV.com, referred to the song as upbeat.

Charts

References

1982 singles
Modern Romance (band) songs
2001 singles
Baha Men songs
Song recordings produced by Tony Visconti
Songs written by Geoff Deane
Songs written by David Jaymes
1982 songs